The women's javelin throw event at the 1951 Pan American Games was held at the Estadio Monumental in Buenos Aires on 28 February.

Hortensia López García finished 5th in the preliminary round and advanced to the final, winning the women's javelin throw with a distance of 39.45m. Her performance was challenged that same day by the Panama athletics delegation, which claimed that only the top 4 athletes should have advanced to the final instead of the top 6. García's finals  performance was briefly discounted, moving Judith Caballero of Panama up to the bronze medal position, but it was reinstated the next day. Some sources still list García's preliminary round mark of 32.68m as her final result.

Results

References

Athletics at the 1951 Pan American Games
1951